The 1985–86 Yugoslav Ice Hockey League season was the 44th season of the Yugoslav Ice Hockey League, the top level of ice hockey in Yugoslavia. 10 teams participated in the league, and Partizan have won the championship.

Final round

Play-offs

Final
Partizan – Jesenice 3–1 (4–2, 6–3, 2–3, 4–3 SO)

3rd place
Olimpija – Red Star 2–0 (4–3, 6–3)

Placing round

External links
Season on hokej.snt.cz

Yugoslav
Yugoslav Ice Hockey League seasons
1985–86 in Yugoslav ice hockey